An ally is a person who is associated with another as a helper; a person or group that provides assistance and support in an ongoing effort, activity or struggle. In recent years, the term has been adopted specifically to a person supporting one or more marginalized groups. A straight ally or heterosexual ally (often simply called an ally) is a heterosexual and cisgender person who supports equal civil rights, gender equality, and LGBTQ+ social movements. Individuals may meet this designation through their actions without actively identifying as an ally.

In February 2012, American writer David M. Hall wrote an article for CNN, about the television show Glee, in which he expressed the following opinion:

Organizations

Gay-Straight Alliance 
Most LGBTQ+ organizations have straight or cisgender members involved, while others actively encourage straight and cisgender participation. A good example of the change straight allies can help achieve is the gay-straight alliance (GSA) which has been becoming more popular in schools all around the world. A gay–straight alliance (also known as a gender-sexuality alliance) is a student-run club that brings together LGBTQ+ and straight students to create a platform for activism to fight homophobia and transphobia. The goal of most gay-straight alliances is to make their school community safe, facilitate activism on campus, and create a welcoming environment for LGBTQ+ students.

History 
The first gay-straight alliance was formed in November 1988 at Concord Academy in Concord, Massachusetts, when Kevin Jennings, a history teacher at the school who had just come out as gay, was approached by Meredith Sterling, a straight student at the school who was upset by the treatment of gay students and others. Jennings recruited some other teachers at the school, thus forming the first gay-straight alliance. (Springate, 2019). Jennings credits students for both the establishment of the club, as well as for setting the agenda of struggling against homophobia, and for changes to CA's nondiscrimination policy (Lane, 2019). Jennings would go on to co-found the Gay, Lesbian & Straight Education Network (GLSEN) in Boston in 1990 (Koelz, 2018).

The GSA Network is an LGBT rights organization founded in 1998 by Carolyn Laub to empower youth activists to start GSA clubs in their respective schools to motivate and inspire fellow students to fight against homophobia and transphobia. Laub initially started working with this movement in 40 GSA clubs in the San Francisco Bay area during 1988–99 and then gradually expanded to other cities and states; by 2005, it began operating programs nationally.

Impact on Students 
Most of what has been written, academically, about LGBTQ+ youth has focused on non-normative development or risk outcomes. This focus has overshadowed and often-times disregarded the ways in which young LGBTQ+ people and their allies are actively engaged in creating positive change for themselves and their peers; for many young people, this active engagement is achieved through involvement and leadership in high school Gay-Straight Alliances (Fields and Russell 2005). Adolescence is an important developmental period for individual engagement in community and social concerns; empowerment suggests that young people discover their capacity to become agents of change in issues and causes they care about. Sexuality activism has emerged as an important arena for youth activism (Fields and Russell 2005) and offers a unique context in which to study youth empowerment.

Those most impacted by gay-straight alliances are LGBTQ+ students; however, gay and straight members alike are benefitted from the sense of community and empowerment that gay-straight alliances provide. In 1994, Anderson categorized gay youth as an "at risk" population. He believes that school-based support groups can help to counter the negative statistics in the lives of gay youth (homelessness, high school dropouts, drug and alcohol abuse, victims of physical violence, and suicide). Participants in this study experienced some of the hopelessness and despair common to gay youth, but they also became empowered young people through their association with the GSA. Being a part of the GSA helped them to move beyond the depressing statistics and gain stronger identities. Their new identities were expressed in their educational lives as well as their personal and social lives. They became empowered by working toward a collective goal: challenging the system in which they previously believed they could not have an impact" (Lee, 2002).

Impact on Society 
According to many studies, involvement in high school gay-straight alliances leads to more civically active young adults. "The current study demonstrated significant associations between GSA involvement level and forms of civic engagement, including efforts to counter discrimination and raise others' awareness of LGBTQ issues. Our findings highlight the promising role that GSAs could play in building civic engagement capacity among their members. Ultimately, as active and engaged citizens, LGBTQ youth and their allies could play a major role in challenging oppressive systems and promoting social justice for LGBTQ individuals in society" (Poteat, Calzo, & Yoshikawa, 2018).

PFLAG 
Parents, Families and Friends of Lesbians and Gays (PFLAG), an international nonprofit organization, works to support LGBTQ+ people and their loved ones. Stemming from parents' desire to be involved in their gay and lesbian children's struggle for equality, PFLAG has been a resource for countless families since 1973. Founded by Jeanne Manford, who is considered the mother of the ally movement, PFLAG unites LGBTQ+ people with parents, families, and allies to gain full civil and legal equality for people in the LGBTQ+ community. In 2007, the organization launched a new project, Straight for Equality to help more allies become engaged with the movement in the workplace, healthcare, and now in faith communities.

"Despite the exclusion of "bisexual" and "transgender" from the organization's name, PFLAG works for the rights of these sexual minorities as well, providing education on gender identification along with sexual orientation. PFLAG's policy statements on such issues as legislation, equality in the workplace, hate crimes, same-gender marriage, religious affiliation, and comprehensive sex education all reflect its deep commitment to ensuring the rights of all glbtq people" (Theophano, 2015).

GLAAD 
GLAAD was established by a group of reporters after an article talked down on HIV/AIDS, being officially founded in 1985. GLAAD put pressure on media organizations to end what it saw as homophobic reporting. Over the years, GLAAD has expanded its resources to provide change for LGBTQ+ members and allies. "As a dynamic media force, GLAAD ensures fair, accurate, and inclusive representation that rewrites the script for LGBTQ acceptance. GLAAD tackles tough issues to shape the narrative and provoke dialogue that leads to cultural change. GLAAD protects all that has been accomplished and envisions a world with 100% LGBTQ acceptance. GLAAD works through entertainment, news, and digital media to share stories from the LGBTQ community that accelerate acceptance".

Historical background

The Stonewall Uprising 
The Stonewall Uprising, or the Stonewall Riots of 1969 (in New York City), is known to be the starting point of the Gay Liberation Front. Protests, advocacy organizations, HIV/AIDS relief groups, etc. collectively have characterized the movement from the start. The Stonewall Uprising, a series of events between police and LGBTQ+ protesters that stretched over six days, became well known due to the media coverage and the subsequent annual Pride traditions. "Stonewall veterans have explicitly stated that they prefer the term Stonewall uprising or rebellion. The reference to these events as riots was initially used by police to justify their use of force. Early publications show that the LGBTQIA+ community largely did not use the term riot until years after the fact" (Library of Congress, 2022).

"The criminalization of homosexuality led many gay establishments to operate sans liquor license, providing an open door for raids and police brutality. Like many gay establishments at the time, the Stonewall Inn was owned by the mafia, and as long as they continued to make a profit, they cared very little what happened to their clientele. Because the owners were still making a profit, they simply adjusted to the raids, and were often tipped off about them ahead of time" (Library of Congress, 2022). The Stonewall Inn remains both as a gay bar and a statement against the violence that it has survived, and has even become a National Historic Landmark. The Stonewall Inn continues to make strides within the LGBTQ+ community with its nonprofit charity. "The Stonewall Inn Gives Back Initiative is ... dedicated to providing educational, strategic and financial assistance to grassroots organizations committed to advocacy for and crucial support to LGBTQ communities and individuals who suffer the indignities and fear arising from social intolerance here in the United States and around the world" (The Stonewall Inn, 2022).

Liberationists 
In the 1970s, a divide emerged within the community over opposing beliefs on what liberation truly meant: the "liberationists" and the "homophiles".

Liberationists presented themselves as being considerably radical; their intent lay in going beyond acceptance and transforming traditional constructs of society (homophobia, sexism, militarism, etc.).

In contrast, homophiles aimed only for what was deemed realistic; instead of dismantling an oppressive system, they simply asked for tolerance. Their group maintained an apologist standpoint, where their end goal was living in peaceful coexistence with the oppressor. This assimilationist perspective held particular appeal with members of the community who were able to "blend in" with heterosexual society.

The existence of such a group left room for a movement that was more sensitive to the struggles, needs, and ultimate goals of more marginalized subcultures. The liberationists, who seemed to be drawing in members of such groups, filled this need.

The emergence of the Liberationists allowed for a wider spectrum of sexual-social behavior and identity to be represented without compromise, and with less risk of infighting. Members of the latter group would not feel forced to conform to the more socially conservatives mores of the former group, while they were able to separate themselves from elements of the gay subculture that they had found crass, excessive, decadent, or extreme.

Stages of allyship 
Sociologist Keith Edwards identifies three stages to the process of becoming an ally in a social movement.

Stage One 
The first stage of allyship is rooted in self-interest. These allies' goals focus entirely on those they love. When taking action as an ally, their impact is individualistic – they perceive the issues of their loved one to have stemmed from the influence of a certain group of people rather than believing the issues to be symptomatic of a greater, oppressive system. This exhibition of early allyship is not necessarily harmful, but since it does not address the larger problem, its effectiveness is limited. Self-interested behavior is most often associated with parents supporting their children. Although these parents are key supporters in the community, it is not always clear whether their help extends beyond their own family and friends.

Stage Two 
The second stage in Edwards' model is that of the ally aspiring for altruism. This is a more developed stage than the former because the ally's motivations are directed toward combating the oppression of an entire group instead of just one individual. They are also more established in the sense that allies at this level begin to show awareness of their societal privilege, yet they tend to assume a savior role toward those they aim to help.

Stage Three 
The third stage of allyship is the ally who fights for social justice. Above all else, the main driver of this stage is respect for those who are oppressed. In contrast to the prior two approaches, allies in the third stage are aware that the group they support is fully capable of advocating for themselves.

Being a Straight Ally 
You can start being an ally by being understanding of how society views or treats people in the LGBTQ+ community by being open to educating yourself. Learn about LGBTQ+ history, their struggles, and the terminologies they use. "As a good straight ally, you allow the people close to you to be who they are and open up to you more by not making assumptions. You have to show action by calling out oppression and being consistent in your advocacy efforts for LGBTQ rights. Call out oppression and discrimination of LGBTQ people at work, home, school, or in other social situations. Attend protests and pride rallies. Educate your other straight friends. As an ally, you will need to challenge the assumptions, stereotypes, and biases you’ve had towards the LGBTQ community." (Queer in the World, 2021).

Challenges raised

Partnership 
Partnership with straight allies has raised challenges as well as benefits for the LGBTQ+ community: there is a perception that such allies evince different levels of 'respect' for the community on whose behalf they advocate, sometimes being patronizing, unaware of their own privilege and power, and crowding out the members. Given that distinguishing between speaking on behalf of a group and speaking for a group is not simple, that line is often crossed without even noticing. This grey area can be referred to as 'positive respect'; a sort of force found in an ally's motives that inhibits the 'servile' (as a result of their internalized oppression) group's freedom to act.

Scrutiny 
Another challenge is that straight allies can be easily discouraged, in the face of scrutiny of their motives and approaches. Newer straight allies can become overwhelmed or confused by the complication of their position in the movement. Since newer allies derive their identity from their personal relations with queer-identifying people, this limits their allyship. Some allies can sometimes respond very defensively to criticism from members of the queer community about their understanding of queer issues, which in turn feeds a concern that they are motivated by the praise they anticipate as their moral reward. Additionally, there is a coming out process for being a straight ally that is not explicitly present in other social movements (concerns about being seen as LGBTQ+); this can hinder the level of advocacy an ally does. In other words, allyship requires support that is accompanied by a distinct protocol many find challenging to achieve. Straight allies protesting at Seattle March for Marriage Equality Allies may receive criticism for a variety of reasons. For example, some believe that allies are unable to step outside their own heteronormative world to advocate. Allies are also criticized for using LGBT advocacy as a means to gain popularity and status.

Role in policy change 
Studies show that elite allies have a positive effect on the policy goals of a social movement, whatever those goals may be. While allies' main role is to provide wider support for the goals of a social movement, their secondary role of influencing policy is also valuable. The allies' role is to inform policymakers of the struggles endured by a community. Allyship of this kind is often effective, though self-interested; for example, high-ranking, conservative government officials Barry Goldwater and William Weld (former Republican governor of Massachusetts), were motivated by their relations with queer family and friends to provide uncharacteristic support for pro-gay policies.

See also

 Athlete Ally
 Atticus Circle
 Gay & Lesbian Alliance Against Defamation (GLAAD)
 Gay-friendly
 Homophile movement
 Human Rights Campaign – LGBT rights
 LGBT rights in the United States
 Straight flag

References

Castelli, P. H. (2020). No Innocent Bystanders: Becoming an Ally in the Struggle for Justice. Anglican Theological Review, 102(1), 137-138.

Clark, C. T., & Blackburn, M. V. (2009). Reading LGBT-themed literature with young people: What's possible?. English Journal, 25-32.

Fields, J., & Russell, S. T. (2005). Queer, sexuality, and gender activism. In L. R. Sherrod, C. A. Flanagan, & R. Kassimir (Eds.), Youth activism: An international encyclopedia (Vol. 2, pp. 512– 514). Westport, CT: Greenwood.

Forbes, T. D., & Ueno, K. (2020). Post-gay, political, and pieced together: Queer expectations of straight allies. Sociological Perspectives, 63(1), 159-176.

Goldstein, S. B., & Davis, D. S. (2010). Heterosexual allies: A descriptive profile. Equity & Excellence in Education, 43(4), 478-494.

Koelz, Heidi (November 2, 2018), "The GSA at 30 – Concord Academy", Concord Academy, Concord, Massachusetts

Lamers, K. (2022, June 14). Pride month: What does it mean to be an ally? Texas Christian University. https://www.tcu.edu/news/2022/what-does-it-mean-to-be-an-ally.php

Levesque, A. (2019). “I’ve Always Wanted a Gay Family Member!”: Straight Ally Girls and Gender Inequality in a High School Gay-Straight Alliance. Qualitative Sociology, 42(2), 205-225.

Poteat, V. P., Calzo, J. P., & Yoshikawa, H. (2018). Gay-Straight Alliance involvement and youths' participation in civic engagement, advocacy, and awareness-raising. Journal of Applied Developmental Psychology, 56, 13-20.

Queer in the World. (2021, November 23). What does straight ally mean? + other straight ally information to help you be a better ally! Queer In The World. https://queerintheworld.com/what-does-

Springate, M. E. (2019). LGBTQ Civil Rights in America. LGBTQ Heritage Theme Study- Volume Two. https://www.scribd.com/document/352110175/LGBTQ-Heritage-Theme-Study-Volume-Two

Stotzer, R. L. (2009). Straight allies: Supportive attitudes toward lesbians, gay men, and bisexuals in a college sample. Sex roles, 60(1), 67-80.

The Stonewall Inn. Welcome. https://thestonewallinnnyc.com/#the-stonewall-story-2

Theophano, T. (2015). Parents, Families and Friends of Lesbians and Gays (PFLAG). GLBTQ Social Sciences, 1-3.

Vernaglia, E. R. (1999). Parents as straight allies: A qualitative study of the experiences of heterosexual parents in the gay rights movement. Boston College.

External links

 Straight for Equality—a straight ally organization
 Human Rights Campaign (a gay rights organization) on being a straight ally
 Allies Out For Change—a straight ally organization

Heterosexuality
LGBT rights
LGBT terminology
Allies (social justice)
Social justice terminology